Cumene hydroperoxide is the organic compound with the formula C6H5CMe2OOH (Me = CH3). An oily liquid, it is classified as an organic hydroperoxide.  Products of decomposition of cumene hydroperoxide are methylstyrene, acetophenone, and cumyl alcohol.  Its formula is C6H5C(CH3)2OOH.

It is produced by treatment of cumene with oxygen, an autoxidation.  At temperatures >100 °C, oxygen is passed through liquid cumene:
  + O2 → 
Dicumyl peroxide is a side product.

Applications
Cumene hydroperoxide is an intermediate in the cumene process for producing phenol and acetone from benzene and propene.

Cumene hydroperoxide is a free radical initiator for production of acrylates.

Cumene hydroperoxide is involved as an organic peroxide in the manufacturing of propylene oxide by the oxidation of propylene. This technology was commercialized by Sumitomo Chemical. 

The oxidation by cumene hydroperoxide of propylene affords propylene oxide and the byproduct cumyl alcohol. The reaction follows this stoichiometry:
  +  →  + 

Dehydrating and hydrogenating cumyl alcohol recycles the cumene.

Safety
Cumene hydroperoxide, like all organic peroxides, is potentially explosive. It is also toxic, corrosive and flammable as well as a skin-irritant.

References

Related terms
Cumene process
2-hydroperoxypropan-2-ylbenzene

External links
Cumene hydroperoxide at International Chemical Safety Cards

Hydroperoxides